Afenginn, which means intoxication and strength in old norse, is a  post-classical/nordic folk music band formed in Copenhagen in 2002.

Composer and band-leader Kim Rafael Nyberg creates inquisitive and imaginative pieces that take an anarchic approach to traditional musical structures. Their compositions range from lyrical, picturesque and programme music-like pieces to jagged up-tempo numbers in odd time signatures, always with the special rhythmic and melodic finesse which characterizes Afenginn.

Performing with artists such as Frank London from the Klezmatics and doing performances with symphony orchestra, Afenginn has always been ambitious for new adventures. Another big-scale project was the ballet SOMA - a large scale modern ballet project created in 2010 at Bellevue Teatret in Copenhagen with the Cross Connection Ballet Company, based on Afenginn's music.

Afenginn has received rave concert and album reviews, music awards and grants. Among other things, the group participated in the "Young Elite" 2009-2011 program initiated by the Danish Arts Council for talented ambitious musicians. In 2012 the production Decenniale was set up at Husets Teater in Copenhagen, celebrating the 10th anniversary of Afenginn, featuring guest musicians, scenography, actor and choir.

Their 6th album "Opus" is a chamber pop symphony in four movements, each with its own distinct color and mood, from dreamy to explosive. With an ensemble of violin, mandolin, clarinet, trombone, marimba, cello, and drums, all subtly contorted by electronic effects, Nyberg ties together his far-flung influences of nordic folk, contemporary classical, and post-rock. Primarily instrumental, each movement of Opus pivots around a text sung by Ólavur Jákupsson and written by Nyberg's childhood friend Timo Haapaniemi in an invented language playfully based on Latin.

Their 5th album LUX is emphasizing the lyrical aerial beauty of light. 4th album Bastard Etno (2010) was chosen "World Album of the Year 2010" in Denmark. Concept album Reptilica Polaris (2008) featuring male choir and brass section, was awarded "Contemporary Folk Artist 2009" at the Danish Folk Music Awards. Akrobakkus (2006) reached the World Music charts Europe in February 2007 and was nominated in several categories at the "Danish Folk and World Music Awards". Retrograd (2004) was chosen "World Album of the Year" in 2005 at the Danish World Music Awards.

History

First meeting (2000-01)

Afenginn was started in an old industrial yard in the harbour area of Copenhagen. Both Kim and Rune had advertised for people to start a band with and saw each other's ads. They met one evening in November together with Andrzej and his brother Alek, who knew Kim from college. The chemistry was good between them, and after some boundless search of direction like blind moose on a highway, everything fell into pieces after a concert with Hedningarna. The band had been experimenting with different styles and moods without any clear direction, but after this eye-opening concert, things got much clearer. Kim, who delivers most of the material, presented a bouquet of folk/world inspired compositions from the darker parts of the brain, and the sprouting band followed his direction.

Complete lineup (2002)
Niels and Rasmus (who knew Kim from Musicology studies) joined the band in February. The band rehearsed steadily during the spring and played their first concert in Dragens Hule, an underground club in Copenhagen, in May the same year.   At that point, the band had very little idea what to play, having rehearsed this contemporary and rather strange music in their little bubble for months. The debut gig turned out to be a great success, though, and Afenginn got booked for Odense Folk Festival and three shows at Kulturhavn Copenhagen later that year. Something had made an impression on the audience. This was highly motivating for the young band, and they continued rehearsing and building a bigger repertoire. Tunes like “Tivoli Invaliid”, “Eine Kleine bit of Amore” and “Masterplan” are all from this period.

Getting gigs (2003)
The band got more and more organized, and Rune got the task of getting the band as many gigs as possible and Afenginn started to have gigs every single month. This would continue for many years as their fan base grew in numbers.
During the summer, Afenginn recorded their EP “Tivoli Invaliid” at Reersø with Bjarke Slot. At the same time, Kim wrote the Elk Suite, for the movie about a moose that swam from Sweden to Denmark and was killed by a train. This would later become more or less a trademark for the band.

Going abroad (2004)
In March, the band went on their first tour abroad - to the Faroe Islands in the North Atlantic, where Afenginn played 7 concerts on the different islands. Among others on an old fishing boat that was rebuilt to a venue, with room for 20 people. The boat had sunk and was lying on the bottom, and as this was not quite horizontal, Kim got really seasick and had to vomit in the break between the sets.   The Faroese label TUTL attended some of the concerts and offered Afenginn a record deal, which was discussed during a stroll in the Faroese mountains and ended up with deal for the debut album.  Later that year, Afenginn visited Norway for some gigs and went from there directly to the studio in Copenhagen in July to record their first full-length album. ‘Retrograd’ was released in October by TUTL Records and was followed up by a Scandinavian tour. ‘Retrograd’ received rave reviews and also won the band a Danish Music Award for “Best World Album”.

Symphony and Swiss harmony (2005)
In the winter, Afenginn was invited to play in Switzerland for the first time. They would continue touring the country in the following years steadily building a fanbase and feeling very much at home.   Later that year, Afenginn played a handful of shows in Denmark with their first major project:  Nordlyd - Afenginn in Symphony. The concerts were built up around Afenginn's music, arranged and orchestrated for a complete symphony orchestra and performed with Afenginn plus the big orchestra on stage. As an addition to the concerts featured a “Nordic Symphony” written by Kim. The concerts were very well received by both press and audiences and were definitely a step up the ladder for the band.   In December, the band went back on the road and played a couple of shows in Belgium and Switzerland.

Getting famous (2006)
The band kept up the high pace and went into a frenetic rehearsal mode In January to prepare for the recording of their second album, which peaked with a show at Copenhagen Jazzhouse where Afenginn presented new material.   ’Akrobakkus’ was recorded during February (read more about the recording here) and was released in April. The album was richly orchestrated and featured, among others, the cult actor Zlatko Buric as well as the gypsy cimbalon virtuoso George Mihalache. The basic tracks were recorded in Sweet Silence in Copenhagen, and after a week there the band moved on to the studio collective at Vibevej where Denmark's most famous guitarist Aske Jacoby also came and went as part of the collective.   Meanwhile, the bass player, Andrzej Krejniuk, decided to focus on his studies at the conservatory and left the band, and at a hectic time the band started looking for a replacement for the rather demanding bass role. One day, Aske was hanging around in the studio and was asked whether he knew a good bass player. He promptly answered: “Ask me!”. They thought about it, went for the offer and welcomed Aske as a new Afenginn member in April 2006.   ’Akrobakkus’ got rave reviews and the band went on an extensive release tour visiting Denmark, Switzerland, Faroe Islands and Estonia. Later in the summer, they were invited to play festivals in Sweden and the big Dranouter Festival in Belgium. A big festival gig was a new experience for the relatively young band. It was a great success... until the power shut down. Fortunately, this happened in the sing-along part of “Andante Mobile”, putting the band at work directing the audience from the stage until the power came back on. When this happened, the scream from the audience was overwhelming, sending the band into a moment of communal ecstasy.  After the concert, Kim presented the other members with his ideas for the band's third album. This would be a concept album featuring the Finnish poet Timo Haapaniemi's abstract syntax error poems in a home-made language, referred to as “street latin”. This would be sung by a male choir and orchestrated for Afenginn, obviously, and a brass band.   In November, the long anticipated movie “Elgen kommer” (“The Moose comes”) by Jacob Remin premiered in Filmhuset in Copenhagen with Afenginn responsible for the music and some of the hype surrounding this poor creature. Read more about the moose here.

Working in New York (2007)
In January the band took their first trip across the Atlantic to New York to collaborate with Frank London, composer and trumpet player in Klezmatics. They rehearsed and worked on some music together for one intense week, which culminated in a couple of shows in New York. Read more about this collaboration here. The followed several tours in various European countries.

Meanwhile, Kim worked on new material and in November Afenginn started rehearsing and recording ‘Reptilica Polaris’ in Aske's studio. Read more about the making of Reptilica Polaris here.

Big name - big grant (2008)
Most of January was used on working on ‘Reptilica Polaris’. At this point, the band was rather exhausted, the recordings had been quite strenuous, and when invited to play at the prestigious By:Larm Festival in Oslo, they needed a break more than the honour, although the shows were pulled through.   After a well deserved break which was spent mixing the album, Afenginn went to America again in March. They were invited to play at South by Southwest in Austin, Texas - the biggest and most influential music event worldwide.   Back home, they finished up the album during a Denmark tour, before they were invited to play in Malaysia in late April. Afenginn played two shows in the monumental botanic garden in Penang. Afenginn were treated as full blown rock stars, held press conferences, were escorted back and forth to the high class hotel and finished the fabulous trip with a nice and warm holiday at Langkawi, much to the liking of the Scandinavian ensemble.

Later that spring, Afenginn were honoured with the biggest grant from the Danish Arts Council's “Young Elite” program, giving the band 400.000 DKK over two years. This came as a surprise for the band, who had plans of taking a small break and gave a massive shot of new energy.  With the responsibility and trust from the Arts Council, as well as the opportunities the money gave them, they decided to keep the engine going, keeping up the momentum.  Afenginn's third and most ambitious album - Reptilica Polaris - was released in June worldwide. Once again, the critics were happy, giving the album great reviews. The audiences also embraced the album, which received a Danish Music Award in the category “Best Contemporary Artist”. In September, the complete album was performed live during the Reptilica Polaris release tour in Denmark. This was a big production which, apart from Afenginn, featured five singers, three brass players and an additional man on the bass, while Aske played the guitar. Read more about the Reptilica Polaris Live Tour here

Signing with Westpark (2009)
In early 2009, Afenginn signed with the well-reputed German label Westpark Music for their next album. The Reptilica Polaris album was a big and heavy production to tour with and the band quickly started work on their next album. After concerts in Germany, the Netherlands, Sweden and Denmark, the fourth album was recorded in a week. ‘Bastard Etno’ was released in November and was followed up by concerts in Denmark, Austria, Switzerland and Germany.

Afenginn does ballet and Roskilde Festival (2010)
The Bastard Etno tour continued in 2010 with concerts in Norway, Denmark and two weeks in Germany. Both record and concerts were very well received, and the album was awarded a Danish Music Award for “World Album of the Year”.  The summer brought many festival gigs. Among others, G! Festival on the Faroe Islands, and Roskilde Festival, a personal ambition for the band for years.
Afenginn then began work with Cross Connection Ballet Company to finish the Bellevue Sommer ballet. The performance “SOMA” was based on Piet Hein's cube by the same name and was built up around Afenginn's music. It featured both old and new material written especially for the occasion. The band performed live at all shows which ran three weeks at the Bellevue Theater and was also performed at Århus Festuge.
In November, Frank London came to Denmark to work with Afenginn. They played three concerts and toured for two weeks as a quintet. The band then took its first break to pause, energize and reflect.

New line up (2011)
After a constructive break, Aske Jacoby decided to quit the band to focus on his own trio. Erik Olevik took over offering both a solid grip on the genre and the ability to play both electric and double bass. This gave the band a new range of options. Kim Nyberg had written new material, and during Christmas they started rehearsals of new material with the new constellation. After a number of summer festivals, they went on their first tour of Canada. In the fall, they toured Denmark for three weeks and Germany for two, playing, among other shows, two sold-out concerts 90 meters below ground. At the end of the year, they recorded a demo for their next album.

10 years lead to “Lux” (2012)
Kim spent one month in India to continue work on the new album. Upon his return, Afenginn celebrated 10 years as a band with a momentous show that featured Bent Clausen and Mads Hyhne as special guests, a three-man choir and a dancer. Samal Blak acted as scenographer and director of the show which was entitled “DECENNIALE – a hyper concert show”. The venue was Husets Teater in Copenhagen and all three shows were sold out. 
During the summer, the new constellation rehearsed and starting recording the new album “Lux” in August with August Wanngren behind the mixer. Recordings are done in only three days (live in the studio as planned) and was finished off in September. In October and November, Afenginn toured Denmark, Austria, Switzerland and Germany playing a lot of their new material. “Lux” was released on 28 January 2013 by Westpark Music.

Releases 
 Tivoli Invaliid (2003) (demo)
 Retrograd (October 2004)
 Akrobakkus (April 2006)
 Reptilica Polaris (June 2008)
 Bastard Etno (November 2009)
 Lux (January 2013)
 Opus (May 2016)

Lineup 
 Kim Nyberg - Mandolin
- born in Finland, Nyberg is the main composer of the band's songs and his long dreadlocks and high energy performances give the band its on stage vibe.
 Rasmus Krøyer - Clarinet
 Niels Skovmand - Violin
 Erik Olevik - Bass guitar
 Rune Kofoed - Drums

Former members:
 Aske Jacoby - bass (2006-2011)
 Andrzej Krejniuk - bass (2002-2006)

External links

References

Danish musical groups
Musical groups established in 2002
Danish folk music groups
2002 establishments in Denmark
Westpark Music artists